The GNR(I) Q Class 4-4-0 steam locomotives of the Great Northern Railway (Ireland) (GNR) were mainly used on cross-border mixed traffic duties between Dublin and Belfast, as well as the "Derry Road" between  and Derry. It was designed for the GNR under the auspices of Charles Clifford and built by Neilson, Reid and Company, North British Locomotive Company and Beyer, Peacock and Company. The Q Class is slightly smaller than the GNR class S 4-4-0  but powerful enough to haul a rake of eight or more carriages.

Faster running was achieved with the addition of superheated boilers and widened cylinders (under the supervision of G.T. Glover in the 1920s, and sometimes known as Qs class).

Preservation

One member of the Q Class, Number 131, has been restored by the Railway Preservation Society of Ireland. It was used mainly on northern routes, the former Ulster Railway main line between Belfast and Clones and the "Derry Road" between Belfast and Derry via . While in service it was in standard GNR black livery. It worked on Córas Iompair Éireann lines from 1958 and was withdrawn in October 1963.

In the late 1970s the locomotive was repainted and placed on a plinth at Dundalk station. In June 1984 No. 131 and its tender were moved to Mallow, County Cork as the main locomotive of the Great Southern Railway Preservation Society. However, this venture was unfulfilled and the locomotive (partially stripped down and with the boiler and firebox out of the frames) was moved to Inchicore Railway Works in the late 1990s while the running frames were moved to Whitehead, County Antrim in May 2003. The Railway Preservation Society of Ireland bought the locomotive from CIÉ in April 2005.

In November 2013, funding under the Generating Opportunities Within (GROW) South Antrim scheme was allocated, permitting (together with completion of No.171 Slieve Gullion's protracted overhaul) the full restoration of No.131. On 22 February 2015, 131 ran from Whitehead to Carrickfergus and back on a trial. This was the locomotive's first run on the mainline in over 50 years. On 5 November 2017, 131 performed three mainline daytime tests to Carrickfergus and Belfast Central. The locomotive returned to mainline service in April 2018, in 1920s black with red lining livery, hauling tender No.37 which has been rebuilt with a new body.  The locomotive's first mainline passenger service since 1963, was a charter to celebrate Northern Ireland Railway's 50th anniversary, where it took a train of Mk2 coaches to Great Victoria Street station.  The locomotive later in the year ran one leg of the RPSI's May tour, running from Whitehead to Belfast, then to Lisburn and up the Antrim Branch to Antrim on 15 May 2018.  131 is now based at Whitehead and operates trains originating in Northern Ireland, although it is now passed to operate trains anywhere on the Irish railway systems.

Table of locomotives

See also
 Diesel Locomotives of Ireland
 Multiple Units of Ireland
 Coaching Stock of Ireland
 Steam locomotives of Ireland

References

External links

webpage for preserved Q Class No.131

Q
4-4-0 locomotives
Neilson locomotives
NBL locomotives
Beyer, Peacock locomotives
Railway locomotives introduced in 1899
5 ft 3 in gauge locomotives
2′B n2 locomotives
2′B h2 locomotives
Steam locomotives of Ireland
Steam locomotives of Northern Ireland